CTLD or cTLD can refer to

C-type lectin-like domain
Country code top-level domain
A configuration object in the IBM i Library standing for "controller description".